Fuzuli District is one of the 66 districts of Azerbaijan. It is located in the south-west of the country and belongs to the Karabakh Economic Region. The district borders the districts of Khojavend, Aghjabadi, Beylagan, Jabrayil, and the Ardabil Province of Iran.

Its capital is Fuzuli, however since the city is completely ruined following the First Nagorno-Karabakh War, the current de facto capital is Horadiz until Fuzuli is rebuilt. As of 2020, the district had a nominal population of 133,800.

History 
The western half, including the capital, was controlled by the self-proclaimed Nagorno-Karabakh Republic, as a result of the First Nagorno-Karabakh War. Horadiz became the temporary administrative centre of Fuzuli District due to city of Fuzuli's occupation by Armenian forces on 23 August 1993.

On October 17, 2020, most of the occupied portion of the district including the capital Fuzuli was announced to have been recaptured by Azerbaijan during the 2020 Nagorno-Karabakh war.

On October 20, 2020, the Government of Azerbaijan announced the recapture of Dordchinar, Kurdlar, Yukhari Abdurrahmanli, Garghabazar, Ashaghi Veysalli, Yukhari Aybasanli villages of the Fuzuli District from Armenian forces. Six more villages (Gejagozlu, Ashaghi Seyidahmadli, Zargar, Mollavali, Yukhari Rafadinli, Ashaghi Rafadinli) of the district were reportedly recaptured between October 21–22, according to Azerbaijani sources.

Displaced People 
IDPs from Nagorno-Karabakh and the surrounding regions were moved to the Fuzuli District from tent settlements around the country to live in new houses built by the government.

See also 
 Armenian-occupied territories surrounding Nagorno-Karabakh

References

External links 
State Statistical Committee of Azerbaijan Republic. Population of Azerbaijan

 
Districts of Azerbaijan